Hale S. Irwin (born June 3, 1945) is an American professional golfer. He was one of the world's leading golfers from the mid-1970s to the mid-1980s. He is one of the few players in history to win three U.S. Opens, becoming the oldest ever U.S. Open champion in 1990 at the age of 45. As a senior golfer, Irwin ranks tied-first all-time in PGA Tour Champions victories. He is widely regarded as one of the greatest players in Champions Tour history.

Along with Gary Player, David Graham, Bernhard Langer and Justin Rose, Irwin is one of five golfers to win official tournaments on all six continents on which golf is played. He has also developed a career as a golf course architect.

Early years
Irwin was born in Joplin, Missouri, and raised in Baxter Springs, Kansas and Boulder, Colorado. His father introduced him to the game of golf when he was four years old; he broke 70 for the first time at age fourteen. Irwin was a star athlete in football, baseball, and golf at Boulder High School and graduated in 1963.

Irwin then attended the University of Colorado in Boulder, played football for the Buffaloes under head coach Eddie Crowder, was a two-time All-Big Eight defensive back (1965, 1966), and academic All-American. He won the individual NCAA championship in golf in his senior year in 1967 and turned professional the following year.

PGA Tour
Irwin had 20 victories on the PGA Tour beginning with the 1971 Sea Pines Heritage Classic and finishing with the 1994 MCI Heritage Golf Classic, and won prize money of just under six million dollars. His 1994 Heritage win at the age of nearly 49 made him one of the oldest winners in Tour history.

Irwin's tournament victories kept him ranked high among his peers - he was ranked among the top five in McCormack's World Golf Rankings in every year from 1975 to 1979, inclusive. He ranked in the top-10 of the Official World Golf Rankings for a few weeks in 1991.

Irwin's first U.S. Open triumph came at Winged Foot in 1974 at the age of 29. In what became known as "The Massacre at Winged Foot", Irwin won with a score of 7-over par, the second-highest winning score in relation to par of any U.S. Open since 1945. The course conditions at Winged Foot in 1974 were described as "brutal". Johnny Miller and several other players suggested that the USGA had intentionally made the Winged Foot course setup particularly treacherous in response to Miller's record-breaking round of 63 at Oakmont the year before. Irwin, however, said in 1974: "I've always enjoyed playing tough courses. It's much more of a challenge to me." Irwin earned $35,000 for his victory at Winged Foot and said that he had a vivid dream three weeks earlier that he won the U.S. Open, which he only told his wife about.

Irwin won the Piccadilly World Match Play Championship at Wentworth Club in 1974 and 1975. He missed out on a record-breaking third straight victory when he was beaten in the 1976 final by Australian David Graham on the second sudden-death playoff hole.

Between 1974 and 1977, Irwin had four consecutive top-5 finishes at The Masters. In 1977, Irwin's three wins on the PGA Tour included a five-shot victory in the Colgate Hall of Fame Classic at Pinehurst Resort. Irwin shot a second round of 62 at Pinehurst for a 15-under par opening 36-hole total of 127, which was the best in any PGA Tour event for over a decade.

Between January 1975 to the end of the 1978 season, Irwin made the cut in 86 consecutive PGA Tour events. To date, this is the fourth-longest streak of consecutive cuts made on the PGA Tour, behind Tiger Woods (142), Byron Nelson (113) and Jack Nicklaus (105).

Irwin added a second U.S. Open title in 1979 at Inverness Club. With its narrow fairways and heavy rough, the Inverness course was a stern test for the players. Irwin's final round of 75 tied the post-World War II tournament record for the highest final round score by a U.S. Open champion. The next month in The Open Championship at Royal Lytham & St Annes, Irwin came to the final round with a two-shot lead. He was bidding to become only the third golfer since 1945 to win the U.S. Open and The Open Championship in the same year after Ben Hogan (1953) and Lee Trevino (1971) – a feat later matched by Tom Watson (1982) and Tiger Woods (2000). Irwin said in 1979: "I would dearly love to win the British Open. It is special." However, he was thwarted in his attempt at an historic double by the incredible recovery play of Seve Ballesteros.

In 1983, Irwin had another close tilt at The Open Championship, but lost by a shot to Tom Watson at Royal Birkdale, after whiffing on a tiny putt of about an inch, during his third round of play. Irwin said that his mistake, which cost him the chance of a playoff with Watson, was "a mental lapse" and that he learned a lesson from it, later being very careful on short putts.

Irwin said in an interview in 2000 that the greatest disappointment of his career was not at the British Open, but at the 1984 U.S. Open at Winged Foot. Irwin had led the tournament after the first three rounds, but shot a final round of 79 to finish 6th. Reflecting on his final round collapse, Irwin said: "A number of factors were in play and it was very emotional. I thought it would be great to win 10 years later at the same venue and, more than anything else, my father was dying of cancer then and I thought it would be wonderful to give him a victory. I destroyed myself with the pressures I'd built up."

After his victory in the 1985 Memorial Tournament, Irwin had occasional top-10 finishes in tournaments for the rest of the 1980s, but he did not have a further official PGA Tour win until an incredible year in 1990, which was capped by his third U.S. Open victory. In a remarkable tournament, Irwin holed an improbable  birdie putt on the 72nd hole to join a playoff against fellow American Mike Donald. In the 18-hole Monday playoff, Donald was two shots ahead of Irwin with three holes to play. Donald missed a 15-foot par putt on the 18th which would have given him victory. Both men shot rounds of 74 in the playoff and Irwin won the title with a birdie on the first sudden-death playoff hole. After becoming the oldest ever U.S. Open champion at the age of 45, winning his first PGA Tour event for five years, Irwin was gracious in victory. He said of his playoff opponent Mike Donald: "God bless him. I almost wish he had won."

Somewhat remarkably, after his 1990 U.S. Open triumph Irwin won the Buick Classic the following week, becoming the first man since Billy Casper in 1966 to win a PGA Tour event the week after gaining the U.S. Open title.

During his career, Irwin won professional tournaments on all six continents on which golf is played: Africa, Australia, Asia, Europe, North America and South America. Irwin played on five Ryder Cup teams: 1975, 1977, 1979, 1981, and 1991. He was inducted into the World Golf Hall of Fame in 1992.

Former U.S. Open champion and television analyst Ken Venturi said of Irwin: "Aesthetically and technically, Hale stands at the ball as well as any player I've ever seen."

PGA Tour Champions
Irwin qualified to play on the over-50 Senior PGA Tour (later the Champions Tour and now PGA Tour Champions) in 1995, and enjoyed even greater success at this level than he did on the PGA Tour. Through the 2021 season, he is the career leader in wins and earnings with 45 victories and over $26 million. Irwin won three consecutive PGA Seniors' Championships between 1996 and 1998, including a 12-stroke victory in the 1997 tournament, which was the largest ever margin of victory in a 72-hole Champions Tour event until Bernhard Langer's 13-stroke victory in the 2014 Senior Open Championship. Irwin's nine victories in 1997 tied the Senior Tour record set by Peter Thomson in 1985.

Irwin won the U.S. Senior Open in 1998 and 2000 for a career total of five USGA titles. He narrowly missed out on a third U.S. Senior Open title in 2004 when he finished one stroke behind Peter Jacobsen.

Irwin is the oldest player to finish in the top five in a senior major, with a third-place finish at the 2012 Senior PGA Championship at the age of 66. In the 2012 3M Championship, Irwin shot a score under his age for the first time in his career. His round of 65 included an eagle on the 9th hole and six consecutive birdies on the back nine. Irwin has since gone on to shoot his age 44 times in official PGA Tour Champions events (as of August 11, 2020), well ahead of Gary Player's second-place 30. While he has continued to play PGA Tour Champions well into his seventies, he has significantly cut back his tournament schedule, competing in no more than eight tour events in any season since 2015.

In 2000, Irwin was ranked as the 19th greatest golfer of all time by Golf Digest magazine.

Personal life
Irwin is married to wife Sally and has two children. Irwin's son Steve qualified for the 2011 U.S. Open. Steve Irwin said of his father: "I'm very proud of him. The U.S. Open is what truly defined his career. It's been my ultimate goal in golf to play in the U.S. Open since I began competing."

For 25 years, Hale Irwin helped to raise money for the St. Louis Children's Hospital, which named a wing in his honor. Irwin also enjoys hunting and fishing and spending time with his grandchildren. He is the uncle of former CU lineman Heath Irwin.

In 2019, in acknowledgement of his character, sportsmanship and commitment to charity, Irwin received the PGA Tour's Payne Stewart Award presented by Southern Company.

Amateur wins
1967 NCAA Division I Championship

Professional wins (83)

PGA Tour wins (20)

PGA Tour playoff record (4–5)

Japan Golf Tour wins (1)

Sunshine Tour wins (1)

PGA Tour of Australasia wins (1)

South American Golf Circuit wins (1)

Other wins (7)

Other playoff record (0–1)

Champions Tour wins (45)

Champions Tour playoff record (2–6)

Other senior wins (7)
1996 Lexus Challenge (with Sean Connery)
1997 Senior Slam at Los Cabos
1998 Senior Match Play Challenge
1999 Senior Skins Game
2000 Our Lucaya Senior Slam
2001 Senior Skins Game
2002 Senior Skins Game

Major championships

Wins (3)

1Defeated Mike Donald with a birdie on the 19th hole after they were tied at 74 (+2) in an 18-hole playoff.

Results timeline

CUT = missed the halfway cut
WD = withdrew
"T" indicates a tie for a place.

Summary

Most consecutive cuts made – 26 (1972 U.S. Open – 1979 Open Championship)
Longest streak of top-10s – 5 (1975 Masters – 1976 Masters)

Results in The Players Championship

CUT = missed the halfway cut
"T" indicates a tie for a place

Senior major championships

Wins (7)

Results timeline
Results not in chronological order before 2017.

The Senior Open Championship was not a senior major until 2003.

CUT = missed the halfway cut
"T" indicates a tie for a place

U.S. national team appearances
This list may be incomplete.
Professional
Ryder Cup: 1975 (winners), 1977 (winners), 1979 (winners), 1981 (winners), 1991 (winners)
Presidents Cup: 1994 (winners, playing captain)
World Cup: 1974, 1979 (winners, individual winner)
UBS Cup: 2001 (winners), 2002 (winners), 2003 (tie), 2004 (winners)
Wendy's 3-Tour Challenge (representing Champions Tour): 1995 (winners), 1996, 1998 (winners), 1999 (winners), 2000, 2003, 2005 (winners)

See also
Spring 1968 PGA Tour Qualifying School graduates
List of golfers with most PGA Tour wins
List of golfers with most PGA Tour Champions wins
List of golfers with most Champions Tour major championship wins

References

External links

University of Colorado - Athletics Hall of Fame - Hale Irwin 

American male golfers
PGA Tour golfers
PGA Tour Champions golfers
Ryder Cup competitors for the United States
Winners of men's major golf championships
Winners of senior major golf championships
World Golf Hall of Fame inductees
Golf course architects
Golfers from Missouri
Golfers from Colorado
Golfers from Kansas
Colorado Buffaloes football players
Colorado Buffaloes men's golfers
Sportspeople from Joplin, Missouri
People from Baxter Springs, Kansas
1945 births
Living people